Minuscule 404 (in the Gregory-Aland numbering), α 467 (in Soden's numbering), is a Greek minuscule manuscript of the New Testament, on parchment. Paleographically it has been assigned to the 13th century. The manuscript has complex contents. 
Formerly it was designated by the symbols 63a and 68p.

Description 

The codex contains a complete text of the Acts of the Apostles, Catholic epistles, and Pauline epistles (Epistle to the Hebrews is placed between 2 Thessalonians and 1 Timothy), on 157 parchment leaves. It is written in one column per page, in 26 lines per page.

Text 

The Greek text of the codex is a representative of the Byzantine text-type. Aland placed it in Category V.

History 

The manuscript once belonged to John Sambucky (together with codex 124). It was presented to Octavio Ferrari in Milano in 1562. It was examined by Treschow, Alter, Andreas Birch, and Burgon. Alter used it in his edition of the Greek New Testament (vol. 2, pp. 741–788). Birch collated some of its readings. C. R. Gregory saw it in 1887.

The manuscript was added to the list of the New Testament manuscripts by Scholz (1794-1852).

Formerly it was designated by the symbols 63a and 68p. In 1908 Gregory gave the number 404 to it.

The manuscript is currently housed at the Austrian National Library (Theol. gr. 313) in Vienna.

See also 

 List of New Testament minuscules
 Biblical manuscript
 Textual criticism

References

Further reading 

 Francis Karl Alter, Novum Testamentum Graecum, ad Codicem Vindobonensem Graece expressum: Varietam Lectionis addidit Franciscus Carolus Alter, 2 vols. 8vo, Vienna, 1786-1787.
 Andreas Birch, Variae Lectiones ad Textum Actorum Apostolorum, Epistolarum Catholicarum et Pauli, Copenhagen 1798, p. XXII.
 Carlo Castellani, Catalogus codicum graecorum qui in bibliothecam D. Marci Venetiarum inde ab anno MDCCXL ad haec usque tempora inlati sunt, Venedig 1895.

External links 
 

Greek New Testament minuscules
13th-century biblical manuscripts
Biblical manuscripts of the Austrian National Library